Lethem is a town in Guyana, located in the Upper Takutu-Upper Essequibo region. It is the regional capital of Upper Takutu-Upper Essequibo.

It is named after Sir Gordon James Lethem, who was the Governor of British Guiana from 1941 to 12 April 1947. The city is populated by 1,702 inhabitants as of 2012.

Lethem has several commercial establishments that distribute shoes, bicycles, shirts and other items; they are especially frequented by Brazilians who usually take goods to Boa Vista, Manaus, Pacaraima and Santa Elena de Uairén.
 
The annual Rodeo on Easter weekend is the city's main event.

Environment and economy

Lethem is part of the Guyanese Rupununi savannah where there are many vaqueiros (as spoken in the Portuguese language), or cowboys, and ranches. Local flora/fauna includes various types of cashew trees, both the fruit and nut varieties; mango trees and Coconut trees are also common. There is a cashew processing plant in St. Ignatius, one of the communities that are a part of Lethem. There is also Culvert City, and New Culvert City, and there are several retail establishments throughout the township of Lethem. The Guyanese Dollar and, the Brazilian Reals, and in some stores, even U.S. currency is now accepted by merchants.

The Guyanese and Brazilian governments opened a bridge in 2009  It cost US$5 million and was paid for by Brazil. over the Takatu river just north of Lethem. The bridge links northern Brazil to the roads leading to the Atlantic coastal port of Georgetown, Guyana's capital, which is about 423 kilometers (263 miles) to the north.

Water is often drawn from hand dug wells although there is a community water supply, though it is slightly salted. Bottled, filtered water is common and easily available in stores, even in 5-gallon containers.

The area's other economic activities are plant and mineral extraction, and tourism. There is a rodeo event during Easter weekend, beginning on Saturday evening, at the Triple R Ranch, with many activities, including bull riding, "wild cow milking", greased pig competition, horse racing, horse rodeo (both bareback and with saddle) for men or women, and for cowgirls, "barrel" horse races. there's also plenty food, such as chicken- or pork-on-a-stick, sun-back beef, and hot dogs. There are also games, contests and entertainment, including a rope pull between vaqueros, and then vaqueras from Georgetown, competing with area Amerindians.

Airport
Lethem has an airport (IATA Code: LTM) that connects it to the capital, Georgetown with scheduled air service most weekdays. The airport has a single, 6,194 foot (1,888 meter) paved runway with instrument markings, but no lighting. The runway is oriented at 07/25. The approach to 07 is often flown in Brazilian airspace which begins less than 1 km from the threshold. Scheduled service is provided by Trans Guyana Airways, twice a day, via a twin engine, as well as by Air Services LTD. Persons traveling by air to Lethem should know that there are strict weight restrictions for luggage. Weight, depending on booking, could be restricted to less than 20 pounds. At present, all luggage is weighed when flying to or from Lethem, and there is a small charge per kilo of weight. The airport office is located just south of the western end of the runway.

Geography
Lethem lies on the Takutu River, which forms the border with Brazil, opposite the Brazilian town of Bonfim. Lethem is the capital of Region 9 and is a hub linking many of the surrounding villages to Georgetown. The Takutu River Bridge over the Takutu River was completed in 2009 It cost US$5 million and was paid for by Brazil. and is the only road link between the two countries. The newly built bridge is expected to bring Brazilian goods to the Georgetown harbor which would be faster than shipping through Brazilian ports.

Demographics
The population of Guyana is varied and includes native Amerindian people who come from 9 original tribes in the savannahs. There is a mixture of Caribbean heritage as well as African. Few white people of Anglo-Saxon heritage live in Guyana and most are there visiting for scientific research in the savannahs or rain forest or visiting on Christian missionary campaigns. The language is an English-based Caribbean creole. Portuguese is also spoken, mainly by Brazilian immigrants, in addition to the many dialects of the Amerindian tribes.

According to the 2002 population census, it had 1,178 inhabitants.

Occupation of the population

Climate
Lethem has a tropical savanna climate (Aw) with moderate to little rainfall from September to April and heavy to very heavy rainfall from May to August.

References

External links

Looking south - January 11, 2007 - The Economist
Commentary: Guyana and Brazil - Bridging for good times - February 13, 2009 - Caribbean Net News
http://www.lib.utexas.edu/maps/americas/guyana_rel_1991.pdf

Populated places in Upper Takutu-Upper Essequibo
Brazil–Guyana border crossings